Fourth seed John Millman won his first ATP Tour title, defeating third seed Adrian Mannarino in the final, 7–5, 6–1. This was the first edition of the tournament, primarily organised due to the cancellation of many tournaments during the 2020 season, because of the ongoing COVID-19 pandemic.

Seeds

Draw

Finals

Top half

Bottom half

Qualifying

Seeds

Qualifiers
  Damir Džumhur 
  Emil Ruusuvuori
  Yūichi Sugita 
  Aslan Karatsev

Qualifying draw

First qualifier

Second qualifier

Third qualifier

Fourth qualifier

References

External Links
Main Draw
Qualifying Draw

Astana Open - Singles